R713 road may refer to:
 R713 road (Ireland)
 R713 (South Africa)